The 1976–77 Missouri Tigers men's basketball team represented the University of Missouri during the 1976–77 NCAA men's basketball season.

Roster

Roster

Schedule

References

Missouri Tigers men's basketball seasons
Missouri
Tiger
Tiger